The SND Arena is an indoor multi-use sport and event venue in Asunción, Paraguay, located within the Complejo SND.  With its new capacity of  seats it was renovated and inaugurated in August 2018. It is used mainly for sports events, such as basketball, handball, futsal, volleyball, skating, gymnastics, among others; and also for music concerts.

Sport events

Concerts

Notes 
1.Canceled as responds to the COVID-19 pandemic.

References

External links 
SND's Official Website

Sports venues in Asunción
Sports venues in Paraguay
Music venues in Paraguay
Indoor arenas in Paraguay